The videography of American recording artist Whitney Houston, nicknamed “The Voice”, consists of fifty-five music videos, four music video compilations, a concert tour video and three music video singles. In 1983, Houston signed a recording contract with Arista Records and two years later released her eponymous debut album. Houston's first music video was for the single "You Give Good Love", which was selected to establish her in the black marketplace first. Houston then released the video of her worldwide hit "Saving All My Love for You". The following video, for the song "How Will I Know", helped introduce the singer to a wider audience when it became one of the first videos by a black female singer to earn heavy rotation on MTV, and it won MTV Video Music Award for Best Female Video at its 3rd ceremony of 1986. "Greatest Love of All", the final single released from Houston's debut album, helped cement the M.O. for the classic Whitney video. In June 1986, Houston released her first video compilation The No. 1 Video Hits, containing her four music videos off the Whitney Houston album. It reached number-one on the Billboard Top Music Videocassettes chart and stayed there for 22 weeks, which remains the all-time record for a video collection by a female artist, it was also certified Platinum for shipments of 100,000 units by the Recording Industry Association of America (RIAA) on July 15, 1986. In 1987, Houston released the music video for "I Wanna Dance with Somebody (Who Loves Me)", the first single from her second album Whitney (1987), which depicts Houston in one of her iconic looks, the clip―towering curly wig, colorful dangly earrings and a series of going-to-the-club outfits. In 1988, the music video for the song "One Moment in Time", the title track off the 1988 Summer Olympics Album: One Moment in Time, was released.

In October 1990, Houston released the video for her song "I'm Your Baby Tonight", the title track from the singer's third album I'm Your Baby Tonight (1990). The following year, "All the Man That I Need" was released as a music video. In 1991, due to overwhelming response to her performance of "The Star Spangled Banner" at Super Bowl XXV, it was released as a video single, which was certified 2× Platinum by the RIAA in April 1991. Such Houston's patriotism-boosting-performance for the national anthem led her to give the Welcome Home Heroes with Whitney Houston concert, in honor of those returning from the Gulf War. The concert was released in VHS that same year and was certified Gold for shipments of 50,000 units by the RIAA. "I Will Always Love You" was the music video for the lead single off the soundtrack for Houston's 1992 film debut The Bodyguard. Having sold over 42 million copies worldwide, the soundtrack is the best-selling soundtrack album of all time. In 1995 and 1996, Houston starred in and contributed on the soundtracks for two films: Waiting to Exhale (1995), which generated the music video for the song "Exhale (Shoop Shoop)"; and The Preacher's Wife (1996). In 1998, Houston released the video for "When You Believe" from The Prince of Egypt Soundtrack, alongside American singer Mariah Carey. In November 1998, Houston released her fourth studio album My Love Is Your Love, whose singles "Heartbreak Hotel", "It's Not Right But It's Okay", and "My Love Is Your Love" all had heavy rotation on MTV.

Houston began the 2000s with her first greatest hits compilation album, Whitney: The Greatest Hits, the homonymous video compilation spawned three then new videos, including two for the duet songs that she collaborated on, with Enrique Iglesias on "Could I Have This Kiss Forever", and with George Michael on "If I Told You That". In December 2002, Houston released her fifth studio album, Just Whitney. Two music videos from the album, "Whatchulookinat" and "Try It on My Own", were considered her answers to the media for getting too deep into her personal life and to malicious rumours surrounding her then-public image. In August 2009, Houston returned to the music scene with her fourth Billboard 200 number-one album, I Look to You, which yielded her final two videos, "I Look to You" and "Million Dollar Bill".

Most of Houston's notable videos involve just a bit of perfunctory storyline and focus on her performance, however, several sources recognized her as one of the pioneers who laid the groundwork and broke down barriers with the videos during her generation. In 2003, VH1 ranked Houston at number three on the list of '50 Greatest Women of the Video Era'. In February 2012, TIME, on a photo article in honor of Black History Month, listed her as one of '50 Cultural Giants'. Gil Kaufman from MTV News said that "[Houston] proved you could make a fuss without making a spectacle."

Music videos

1980s

1990s

2000s

2010s

As featured artist and cameo appearances

Video albums

Music video compilations

Concert videos

As featured artist

Unofficial concert videos

Video singles

See also 
 Whitney Houston albums discography
 Whitney Houston singles discography
 List of number-one hits (United States)
 List of best-selling music artists

References

External links 
 [ Videography of Whitney Houston] at Allmusic

videography
Videographies of American artists